Girchi — More Freedom is a libertarian political party in Georgia. It was founded by Zurab Japaridze, former chairman of the New Political Center — Girchi. The party supports Atlanticism.

Electoral results

Local elections

Tbilisi city assembly election results

References

External links 
 

2020 establishments in Georgia (country)
Liberal parties in Georgia (country)
Centre-right parties in Georgia (country)
Political parties established in 2020
Political parties in Georgia (country)
Pro-European political parties in Georgia (country)